The 2021–22 season was Leeds United's 102nd season in existence. It was their second consecutive season in the Premier League, and in general, it is their 52nd ever season in the top flight of English football. In addition to the league, they also competed in the FA Cup and EFL Cup.

Review

August
Leeds began their Premier League campaign against "Battle of the Roses" rivals Manchester United at Old Trafford on 14 August 2021, live on BT Sport, losing by a score of 5–1. Bruno Fernandes opened the scoring for Manchester United in the 30th minute. After the half-time interval, Luke Ayling levelled the scores, with his first Premier League goal for Leeds. Mason Greenwood then put Manchester United ahead again in the 52nd minute, after Paul Pogba released him down the left wing. Fernandes added Manchester United's third in the 54th minute, after another assist from Pogba, and he completed his hat-trick with Manchester United's fourth goal in the 60th minute after Victor Lindelöf found him with a long ball. Fred then scored Manchester United's fifth goal in the 68th minute after a fourth assist from Pogba, a joint-Premier League record for a single match. The result left Leeds bottom of the Premier League table after the first match-week.

Leeds next hosted Everton at Elland Road on 21 August 2021 at 15:00 BST. This was the first time Elland Road had a full capacity since the start of the COVID-19 pandemic. Leeds drew 2–2 with Dominic Calvert-Lewin opening the scoring from a penalty after referee Darren England ruled that Liam Cooper had fouled Calvert-Lewin by pulling on his shirt after consulting VAR. Mateusz Klich equalised for Leeds after Patrick Bamford found him. In the second half, Everton went in front after a Demarai Gray goal, however, Leeds later equalised through Raphinha. Raphinha became the first Leeds player to score in three consecutive matches against Everton since Peter Lorimer. The result moved Leeds out of the relegation places and up to 15th in the Premier League table.

Leeds' following match was against League One club Crewe Alexandra at Elland Road in the EFL Cup second round on 24 August. Leeds won the tie 3–0 with a goal from captain for the night Kalvin Phillips and two more from Jack Harrison.

Leeds' final match before the first international break of the season saw them travel to Turf Moor to draw 1–1 with Sean Dyche's Burnley on 29 August 2021. Burnley opened the scoring after a Matthew Lowton shot fell into former Leeds player Chris Wood's path, allowing him to prod the ball home; however, Leeds equalised through Bamford after a Jamie Shackleton shot fell into his path so he could foot it into the Burnley goal past Nick Pope. This was Bamford's first goal of the 2021-22 Premier League season and it came after England manager Gareth Southgate announced that he would receive his first England call-up for the 2022 FIFA World Cup Qualifiers in Group I against Hungary away at the Puskás Aréna on 2 September 2021, Andorra at home at Wembley Stadium on 5 September 2021 and Poland away at the PGE Narodowy on 8 September 2021. The result left Leeds in 15th place in the Premier League table before the first international break of the season — above Burnley in 16th place and below Palace in 14th place.

September
Leeds' first match after the first international break of the season saw them host Jürgen Klopp's Liverpool at Elland Road - the visitors sat in fifth place in the Premier League table, above Everton who sat in sixth place and below Chelsea who sat in fourth place. This game saw them lose 3-0 on 12 September 2021, with Pascal Struijk receiving a red card due to a challenge on Harvey Elliott that resulted in a serious injury.

The next two matches saw Leeds draw 1-1 with Newcastle United away (who at the time were in the relegation zone), with an early Leeds goal from Raphinha being cancelled out by one from Allan Saint-Maximin before half time; and a 1-2 loss at home to West Ham United with a 90th-minute goal by Michail Antonio winning it for the visitors. Six games into the Premier League season, Leeds United were still without a win.

October 
Leeds started October on a positive note, getting their first win of the season and their first clean sheet in a 1-0 win over Watford at Elland Road.  Next up were Southampton who defeated Leeds narrowly, Armando Broja netting the only goal of the match. A last-minute draw against Wolves achieved through a Rodrigo penalty in stoppage time and a narrow win at Norwich saw Leeds ending the month in 17th place.

November 
November started with a 1-1 draw with Leicester at home, continued with a loss away at Tottenham and a draw at Brighton and ended with more last-minute drama. The game against Crystal Palace was still tied at 0-0 as Raphinha floated in a corner kick and Liam Cooper’s connecting header was blocked by the hand of Palace defender Marc Guehi. Raphinha took responsibility upon himself and slotted the penalty past Vicente Guaita to send Elland Road into ecstatic celebrations.

December 
December started right where November ended in terms of drama as Leeds rescued a point in a 2-2 draw against Brentford, Patrick Bamford scoring his second goal of the season in the 96th minute. In their following game, Leeds’ luck ran out, losing 3-2 against Chelsea at Stamford Bridge with two goals being scored by Jorginho through spot-kicks, the winner being scored in the 94th minute. Leeds then received their biggest loss of the season, and the joint-heaviest defeat of all Premier League teams for the 2021-22 season (equalling Chelsea's 7-0 win over Norwich), at the hands of Manchester City. Leeds ended the month with a 4-1 defeat at home to Arsenal, which led to them ending the month sitting in 16th place with just 16 points.

January 
January finally ended a drought of four games without a win, where Leeds also conceded 16 goals: a 3-1 victory at home against Burnley was followed by a 3-2 away win against West Ham, Jack Harrison scoring all three in the latter. The month was rounded off with a 1-0 loss against Newcastle.

February 
February saw Leeds start in 15th place but going on their worst run of the season.  The first game of February was a spectacular 3-3 away draw against Aston Villa with Daniel James scoring a brace for Leeds and Coutinho scoring his first goal for Villa. Leeds then lost to Everton (3-0), Manchester United (4-2), Liverpool (6-0) and Tottenham (4-0) scoring only two goals and conceding 17 - a Premier League record for the most in a calendar month. Following the Spurs game, and after over three-and-a-half years in charge, Marcelo Bielsa was sacked by the club. His replacement was former RB Salzburg and RB Leipzig coach Jesse Marsch.

March 
The start of March saw unimproved form. Leeds slumped to defeats against Leicester (0-1 away) and to Aston Villa (3-0 at home). In typical Leeds fashion, wins came in the form of a 90+4 winner by Joe Gelhardt against Norwich (result 2-1) and a 90+1 winner by Luke Ayling in a 3-2 comeback win against Wolverhampton Wanderers. Leeds were sitting in 16th place but didn't have much of a buffer above the relegation spots. Everton and Burnley for example had three games in hand while sitting below Leeds in the table.

April 
April started with a draw against Southampton at Elland Road (1-1) and was followed by a 3-0 victory over Watford at Vicarage Road. Leeds was still sitting in 16th place while the teams below them started to pick up form. A frustrating draw to Palace was followed by a nearly inevitable loss to Manchester City (4-0) which saw Leeds slipping into 17th place as Burnley overtook them.

May 
With four games left, May was make or break for Leeds United. Their next games saw tough opponents in Arsenal and Chelsea, which both led to defeats: 2-1 at the Emirates, after a red card for a Luke Ayling tackle in the 27th minute was preceded by two goals in the first 10 minutes by former Leeds loanee Eddie Nketiah. The 3-0 loss at home to Chelsea featured another first-half red for the Whites: a 24th-minute dismissal of Dan James for a dangerously high challenge.
 The loss against Arsenal saw Leeds slip into 18th place, a relegation spot, for the first time since September. With Everton on the brink of achieving safety as Watford and Norwich were already guaranteed to be relegated, this led to a two-horse race between Burnley and Leeds heading into the last two fixtures of the season.

Burnley lost to Tottenham on the same day that Pascal Struijk rescued a point for Leeds in a 1-1 draw against Brighton at home, the defender heading in a Joe Gelhardt cross in the 92nd minute. Leeds was above Burnley for now, but Burnley had a game in hand in which they drew with Aston Villa. This meant that Leeds and Burnley were now level on points but, with Burnley's superior goal difference of 20, Leeds had to better Burnley's result on the last day of the season.

Burnley faced off against Newcastle and fell behind in the 20th minute through Callum Wilson. Leeds took the lead against their opponents Brentford through a penalty in the 56th minute that Raphinha converted and shortly after that, Newcastle doubled their lead against Burnley.

In the 69th minute, Maxwel Cornet scored for Burnley as his team now pushed everything forward, trying desperately to level the scores, while in London a 78th minute Brentford equaliser through a Canós header saw Burnley's hopes come to life again. But the dismissal by Canós just two minutes later for a second bookable offence saw Leeds' press for the final 10 minutes come to fruition, with Jack Harrison scoring a deflected long-shot in the 94th minute which secured Leeds 17th place spot in the Premier League, the first side since Wigan in 2011 to survive after starting the final day in the bottom three. 

Leeds stayed up with 38 points from nine wins and 11 draws, scoring 42 goals and conceding 79.

Transfers

Transfers in

Transfers out

Loans out

Pre-season
On 18 June 2021, Leeds announced six pre-season friendly matches, against Guiseley, Blackburn Rovers, Fleetwood Town, Real Betis, Ajax and Villarreal. On 12 August 2021, it was announced that head coach Marcelo Bielsa had signed a new one-year contract with the club after his previous contract ran out after the end of the previous season on 30 June 2021.

First-team squad

As of 26 March 2022.

Competitions

Premier League

League table

Results by matchday

Matches

FA Cup

Leeds were drawn away to West Ham United in the third round.

EFL Cup

The second round draw was made by Andy Townsend and Jobi McAnuff, live on Sky Sports. Leeds were drawn at home against Crewe Alexandra of the EFL League One. The match was played on 24 August 2021 at 19:45 BST and saw Leeds win 3–0. The draw for the third round was held on 25 August and was made by Kevin Phillips and Kevin Campbell. Leeds were drawn against Fulham of the EFL Championship at Craven Cottage. The match will be played during the week commencing 21 September 2021. On 22 September, Leeds were drawn away to Arsenal in the fourth round.

Player statistics

The plus (+) symbol denotes an appearance as a substitute, hence 2+1 indicates two appearances in the starting XI and one appearance as a substitute.

In addition, Jack Jenkins and Academy players Kris Moore, Nohan Kenneh and Archie Gray were unused substitutes included in at least one matchday squad.

Notes

See also
 2021–22 in English football
 List of Leeds United F.C. seasons

References

Leeds United
Leeds United F.C. seasons
Foot